Ivan Calin (10 March 1935 – 2 January 2012) was a Soviet and Moldovan agronomist-scholar, political scientist, diplomat and politician.

Biography
Calin was born in the small village of Plot in Rîbnița District, then in Moldavian Autonomous Soviet Socialist Republic.

Calin was President of the Presidium of the Supreme Soviet of the Moldavian SSR from 10 April 1980 to 24 December 1985. Following this he became prime minister of the Moldavian SSR until 10 January 1990.

He was elected as member of the Parliament of Moldova in the 1998 election, 2005 election, April 2009 election and July 2009 election.

Until the speaker was elected, the plenary meetings of the Moldovan Parliament were chaired by the oldest MP, making Calin the acting speaker from 5 to 12 May 2009.

Awards 
 Order of Lenin
 Three Orders of the Red Banner of Labour
 Order of the Republic

References

 Enciclopedia sovietică moldovenească, 1970–1977.

External links
 APCE - Ivan Calin
 Калин Иван Петрович

 

Prime Ministers of Moldova
1935 births
2012 deaths
People from Rîbnița District
Central Committee of the Communist Party of the Soviet Union candidate members
Communist Party of Moldavia politicians
Communist Party of the Soviet Union members
Heads of government of the Moldavian Soviet Socialist Republic
Members of the parliament of Moldova
Moldovan MPs 1998–2001
Moldovan MPs 2001–2005
Moldovan MPs 2005–2009
Moldovan MPs 2009
Moldovan MPs 2009–2010
Party of Communists of the Republic of Moldova politicians
Presidents of the Moldovan Parliament
Tenth convocation members of the Soviet of the Union
Eleventh convocation members of the Soviet of the Union
Recipients of the Order of Lenin
Recipients of the Order of the Red Banner of Labour
Recipients of the Order of the Republic (Moldova)
Moldovan economists

Soviet economists